KOSY (790 AM) is a radio station broadcasting an oldies format. Licensed to Texarkana, Arkansas, United States, it serves the Texarkana area. The station is owned by Townsquare Media. Studios are located on Arkansas Boulevard in Texarkana, Arkansas and its transmitter is on Line Ferry Road in the south portion of the city.

The radio station was originally built in 1951 by W. Decker Smith, MD, as an investment. It was affiliated with the CBS Radio Network. His son, James K. Smith, ran the station for many years as the general manager. The studios were established in the same building at 119 E. 6th as the Smith Clinic medical practice. Well into the 1980s, until the building was destroyed by a fire, remnants of the old medical practice remained on the upper floors including X-ray equipment and examination tables (the broadcasting studios were on the lower floors).

In 1989, the younger Smith, who had suffered a heart attack and was approaching retirement, sold the station to corporate interests along with its sister station, KOSY-FM (Y102), which was broadcasting a contemporary hit format at the time of sale. The new owners changed the call signs to KKYR and implemented a country music format, which exists to this day. The transmitter site of KOSY remains on the city's southern border off Line Ferry Road but KKYR began transmitting from a taller shared tower near Robinson Road in Texarkana shortly after the sale. This new broadcast tower could properly accommodate the 100,000-watt Class C license held by Smith since the station's sign-on in 1965 (the station operated at only 35,000 watts for many years).

The KOSY transmitter site on Line Ferry Road has two towers, constructed for a nighttime directional signal of 500 watts. The station now operates non-directional on one tower with .023 watts of power at night.

On December 30, 2021, KOSY changed its format from gospel to oldies, branded as "Good Time Oldies 790/107.5", launching on FM translator K298DB, licensed to Texarkana, using the Good Time Oldies format form Westwood One.

References

External links
Good Time Oldies 790/107.5

OSY (AM)
Oldies radio stations in the United States
Townsquare Media radio stations
Radio stations established in 1951
1951 establishments in Arkansas